Canarias Basketball Academy is a basketball institute based in Tenerife, Canary Islands, Spain.

Its senior team currently plays in the Spanish Basketball Federation with their U18 and U16 teams. The junior team usually participates in the Euroleague Basketball Nike International Junior Tournament. It also takes part in different tournaments in the USA such as the MaxPreps Tournament, the Hoop Group Under Armour and the Adidas Nations.

History
Founded in 2007, the Canarias Basketball Academy was created with the aim of developing basketball players from all the world. Every year over 30 nationalities are represented in the academy, and it has grown from 15 players in 2007 to more than 100 in 2015.

Canarias Basketball Academy's founder and Director, Rob Orellana, saw that an academy as CBA in Europe could provide a key stepping stone for young players wanting to play college basketball in the United States. Since then Orellana has built a unique project in Europe that has sent more than 65 players have played in NCAA Division I like Matz Stockman (Louisville), Michal Cekovsky (Maryland), Thomas van der Mars (Portland), Boris Bojanovsky (Florida State), Patrik Auda (Seton Hall), or Vladimir Brodziansky (Texas Christian University)

In August 2014, the CBA achieved a vacant berth in LEB Plata league, the Spanish third division.

Season by season

Notable players

 Vladimir Brodziansky

 Charlon Kloof
 Tom Maayan
 Menelik Watson
Andy Van Vliet

References

External links
Official website
Spanish Basketball Federation profile

Basketball teams in the Canary Islands
Former LEB Plata teams
Sport in Tenerife
Basketball organizations
2007 establishments in Spain